Keith Edward Bush OBE (7 December 1929 - 29 September 2017) was a British Army artillery officer and Russia analyst.

Early life
Keith Bush was born on 7 December 1929 and educated at Dulwich College and Harvard University.

Career
He worked for Radio Liberty, latterly as research director, from 1963 to 1994.

He was director, Russian and Eurasian program, at the Centre for Strategic and International Studies from 1994 to 2001.

Selected publications
Average industrial earnings and income tax in the USSR and the West. Radio Liberty Committee, 1966.
A comparison of retail prices in the United States, the USSR and Western Europe. Radio Liberty Committee, 1967.
Environmental Disruption: The Soviet Response. Radio Liberty Committee, 1972.
From the Command Economy to the Market: A Collection of Interviews. Dartmouth, 1991.

References

External links
https://www.linkedin.com/in/keith-bush-36762218/

1929 births
2017 deaths
Royal Artillery officers
People educated at Dulwich College
Radio Free Europe/Radio Liberty people
Officers of the Order of the British Empire
Harvard University alumni